Lambertus Nicodemus Palar (5 June 1900 – 13 February 1981), also known as Babe Palar, represented the Republic of Indonesia in various diplomatic positions most notably as the first Indonesian representative to the United Nations. He also held ambassadorships in India, West Germany, the Soviet Union, Canada, and the United States. He was the son of Gerrit Palar and Jacoba Lumanauw.

Early life and education 
Palar attended middle school in Tondano. He moved to Java to attend high school in Yogyakarta where he stayed with Sam Ratulangi. In 1922, Palar started his studies at the Technical University in Bandung, which is now known as the Bandung Institute of Technology. At this school, Palar became acquainted with Indonesian nationalists such as Sukarno. A severe illness forced Palar to drop out of the school and to return to Minahasa. Palar eventually restarted his studies at faculty of law in Batavia (now Jakarta) where he joined the youth organization called Young Minahasa. In 1928, Palar moved to the Netherlands.

Political career 
In 1930, Palar became a member of the Social-Democratic Workers' Party shortly after the SDAP convened a Colonial Congress and voted on propositions that included unconditionally recognizing the right of national independence for the Dutch Indies. Palar then held the position of secretary of the Colonial Commission of the SDAP and the Netherlands' Trade Union Federation starting in October 1933. He was also the director of Persbureau Indonesia (Persindo), which was given the task of sending articles related to Dutch social democracy to the Dutch Indies. In 1938, Palar returned to his homeland with his  wife, Johanna Petronella Volmers, whom he married in 1935. He traveled throughout the archipelago and gathered information on the current developments. He discovered that the Indonesian nationalist movement was very much alive and returned to the Netherlands writing about his experience.

During the German occupation of the Netherlands, Palar could not work for the SDAP and instead was employed in the Van der Waals Laboratorium. He also taught Malay language classes and was a guitarist in a Kroncong ensemble. During the war, Palar and his wife joined the anti-Nazi underground movement.

After the war, Palar was voted into the Lower House representing the newly established Labor Party, which originated from the SDAP. After the Indonesian Declaration of Independence on August 17, 1945, Palar being sympathetic to the proclamation promoted contacts with the Indonesian nationalists. This was not received well by the PvdA resulting in the party distancing itself from the original position of unconditionally recognizing the right of national independence for Indonesia, which was opposed by Palar. Being assigned by his party on a fact finding mission to Indonesia, Palar again met with the leaders of the Indonesian National Revolution including President Sukarno. Palar continued to urge non-violent resolution of the dispute between the Netherlands and the new Republic of Indonesia. However, on July 20, 1947, the parliament voted to commence Police Action in Indonesia. Palar resigned from the parliament and the Labor Party the following day.

Representing Indonesia 

Palar joined the effort for international recognition of Indonesian independence by becoming the Indonesian Representative to the United Nations in 1947. He remained in this position until 1953. This time period included such important events as the continued Dutch-Indonesian conflict, the transfer of sovereignty from the Dutch, and the inclusion of Indonesia as a member of the United Nations.

During the Dutch-Indonesian conflict, Palar argued the case of Indonesian independence at the UN and the Security Council, even though his status was only as an "observer" because Indonesia was not a member of the UN at the time. After a second Police Action was unpopular and subsequently condemned by the Security Council, the Roem–Van Roijen Agreement was signed, which led to the Dutch-Indonesian Round Table Conference and the recognition of Indonesian sovereignty by the Dutch on 27 December 1949.

Indonesia was admitted as the 60th member state of the United Nations on 28 September 1950. Addressing the General Assembly as the first Indonesian ambassador to the United Nations, Palar thanked those that supported the Indonesian cause and pledged that Indonesia would assume the responsibilities of being a member state. Palar continued his work at the UN until being assigned the Indonesian ambassadorship for India. In 1955, Palar was called back to Indonesia and was instrumental in planning the Asia-Africa Conference, which gathered Asian and African states, most of which were newly independent. After the conference, Palar resumed his ambassadorial responsibilities by representing Indonesia in East Germany and the Soviet Union.

From 1957 to 1962, he became the ambassador to Canada and afterwards returned to the UN as Ambassador until 1965. Sukarno withdrew Indonesia's membership in the UN because of the Indonesia–Malaysia confrontation and upon the election of Malaysia to the Security Council. Palar then became the ambassador to the United States. Under new leadership of Suharto in 1966, Indonesia requested the resumption of membership in the UN with a message to the Secretary General that was delivered by Palar.

Retirement and death 
Palar retired from foreign service in 1968 having served his country during its early struggles and conflicts and battled for its freedom in the diplomatic arena. Palar returned to Jakarta, but remained active through lectureships, social work, and as an advisor to the Indonesian Representative to the United Nations.

Lambertus Nicodemus Palar died in Jakarta on 13 February 1981. He was survived by his wife, Johanna Petronella "Yoke" Volmers, and children Maria Elisabeth Singh, Maesi Martowardojo, and Bintoar Palar.

In November 2013 Palar, together with Rajiman Wediodiningrat and T. B. Simatupang, was declared a National Hero of Indonesia.

References

Bibliography 

 
 
 
 
 
 
 
 

1900 births
1981 deaths
Ambassadors of Indonesia to Canada
Ambassadors of Indonesia to India
Ambassadors of Indonesia to the Soviet Union
Ambassadors of Indonesia to the United States
Indonesian Christians
Indonesian diplomats
People of Sangirese descent
Labour Party (Netherlands) politicians
Members of the House of Representatives (Netherlands)
Minahasa people
National Heroes of Indonesia
People from Tomohon
Permanent Representatives of Indonesia to the United Nations
Social Democratic Workers' Party (Netherlands) politicians